Trichonephilia fenestrata is a species of araneid spider known to be found in South Africa and Zambia. Males of this species  often autotomize their legs as a counter adaptation to the sexual cannibalism of females.

References 

Araneidae
Spiders described in 1859
Spiders of South Africa
Taxa named by Tamerlan Thorell